2008 in esports

 
Esports by year